David Hale is an American politician serving as a member of the Kentucky House of Representatives from the 74th district. Elected in November 2014, he assumed office on January 1, 2015.

Early life 
A native of Wellington, Kentucky, Hale graduated from Menifee County High School in 1974.

Career 
Outside of politics, Hale works as a pastor. He was previously employed at the Minor Clark State Fish Hatchery, operated by the Kentucky Department of Fish and Wildlife Resources, from 1975 to 2004. Hale was elected to the Kentucky House of Representatives in November 2014 and assumed office on January 1, 2015. During the 2015 legislative session, he served as vice chair of the House Tourism and Outdoor Recreation Committee. Since 2019, he has served as chair of the House Enrollment Committee.

References 

Living people
People from Jefferson County, Kentucky
People from Menifee County, Kentucky
Republican Party members of the Kentucky House of Representatives
Year of birth missing (living people)